Villette is a Charleroi Metro station, located at the southwestern end of Charleroi downtown, in fare zone 1. It was the first metro station in Belgium to be built on a viaduct, spanning over the river Sambre. The station is accessible from both banks of the river and features a central platform serving two tram tracks. Villette station is particularly close (300 m) to the Sud station.

Nearby points of interest 
 Headquarters of TEC Charleroi, a subsidiary of the Société Régionale Wallonne du Transport in charge of public transportation in Charleroi.
 Charleroi branch of the Federal Public Service Finance.

Transfers 
There are no direct train or bus transfers at this station.

Charleroi Metro stations
Railway stations opened in 1976